Julianna Baggott (born 30 September 1969) is a novelist, essayist, and poet who also writes under the pen names Bridget Asher and N.E. Bode. She is an associate professor at Florida State University's College of Motion Picture Arts. She is a 2013 recipient of the Alex Awards.

Life
Baggott has published over twenty books under her own name and pen names. Her recent novels, Pure and Harriet Wolf's Seventh Book of Wonders, were New York Times Notable Books of the Year. To date, there are over one hundred foreign editions of her novels.

Baggott began publishing when she was twenty-two. After receiving her M.F.A. from the University of North Carolina at Greensboro, she published her first novel, Girl Talk, while she was still in her twenties. Girl Talk was a national bestseller and was quickly followed by Boston Globe bestseller The Miss America Family, and then Boston Herald Book Club selection, The Madam, a historical novel based on the life of her grandmother. She co-wrote Which Brings Me to You with Steve Almond, A Best Book of 2006 (Kirkus Reviews) optioned by producer Richard Brown and adapted by Keith Bunin.

She has published four novels under the pen name Bridget Asher—My Husband's Sweethearts, The Pretend Wife, The Provence Cure for the Brokenhearted. and All of Us and Everything.

She also writes bestselling novels for younger readers under the pen name N.E. Bode as well as under Julianna Baggott. The Anybodies trilogy was a People Magazine pick alongside David Sedaris and Bill Clinton, a Washington Post Book of the Week, a Girls' Life Top Ten, a Booksense selection, and was in development at Nickelodeon/Paramount; The Slippery Map (fall 2007), and the prequel to Mr. Magorium's Wonder Emporium (2007), a movie starring Dustin Hoffman, Natalie Portman, and Jason Bateman. For two years, Bode was a recurring personality on Sirius XM Radio.

Julianna's Boston Red Sox novel The Prince of Fenway Park (HarperCollins), was published in spring 2009. The Ever Breath (Random House) was published in December 2009.

Baggott has also published four collections of poetry (This Country of Mothers, Compulsions of Silkworms and Bees, and Lizzie Borden in Love) and Instructions, Abject and Fuming. Her poems have been published in major literary publications, including Poetry, The American Poetry Review, and The Best American Poetry.

Baggott's work has appeared in AGNI, The New York Times, The Boston Globe, Glamour, Ms., Real Simple, and read on NPR's Here and Now and Talk of the Nation. Her work is often optioned for film and television, and her essays, stories, and poems are highly anthologized.

She lives in Florida with her husband writer David G.W. Scott and their four children.

Awards
 American Library Association Alex Award
 Delaware Division of Arts fellowship
 Virginia Center for the Creative Arts fellowship
 Ragdale Foundation fellowship
 Bread Loaf Writers' Conference fellowship

Work online
 "Pep Talk from Julianna Baggott", National Novel Writing Month, November 2009
 Hello, Stranger, an essay in Real Simple
 Playing Role Reversal with My Therapist, an essay in The New York Times
 The key to literary success? Be a man--or write like one., an essay in The Washington Post
 "Mary Todd on her Deathbed", a poem on TheAtlantic.com
 "Monica Lewinsky thinks of Bill Clinton While Standing Naked in Front of a Hotel Mirror," a poem on TheAtlantic.com
 "My Mother's National Geographics," a poem archived at The Virginia Quarterly Review
 "My Cousin Attempts Suicide In Gander Hill Prison," a poem archived at The Virginia Quarterly Review
 "Blurbs," a poem, published in The Southern Review
  a poem, published in The Southern Review
 "What the poets could have been," a poem, published in The Southern Review

Novels

under pen name Bridget Asher

Novels for young readers

Collections of poetry

References

External links
Author's blog
Interviews online
 "Did Publishers Overlook Women Writers" an interview on NPR's Tell Me More with Michel Martin.
 Magical Things: An Interview with Julianna Baggott at PopMatters
 An Interview with Julianna Baggott and Steve Almond at Bookslut
 Mothers Who Write: Julianna Baggott an interview by Cheryl Dellasega, Ph.D.
 Poetic Asides interview with Robert Lee Brewer

 Radio Interview with Julianna Baggott on "Read First, Ask Later" (Ep. 4)

1969 births
Living people
21st-century American novelists
American women novelists
University of North Carolina at Greensboro alumni
Florida State University faculty
American women poets
American women essayists
21st-century American women writers
21st-century American poets
21st-century American essayists
Novelists from Florida
American women academics